The 2011–12 UAB Blazers men's basketball team represented the University of Alabama at Birmingham in the 2011–12 NCAA Division I men's basketball season. The Blazers' head coach, Mike Davis, was in his sixth season at UAB. The Blazers, who compete in Conference USA, played their home games at Bartow Arena.

Incoming Players

Source

Roster

Source

See also
UAB Blazers men's basketball

References

UAB Blazers men's basketball seasons
UAB
UAB Blazers men's basketball
UAB Blazers men's basketball